Wangcun is a town in Muye District, Xinxiang, Henan, People's Republic of China, located at the northwestern periphery of Xinxiang's urban area. , it has one residential community and 19 villages under its administration.

See also 
 List of township-level divisions of Henan

References 

Township-level divisions of Henan